Ivukova is a rural locality (a village) in Stepanovskoye Rural Settlement, Kudymkarsky District, Perm Krai, Russia. The population was 206 as of 2010. There are 10 streets.

Geography 
Ivukova is located 6 km southwest of Kudymkar (the district's administrative centre) by road. Peshnigort is the nearest rural locality.

References 

Rural localities in Kudymkarsky District